Elizabeth "Eliza" Kortright Monroe Hay (December 1786 – January 27, 1840) was an American socialite who acted as unofficial First Lady during her father James Monroe's presidency, as her mother's health kept her away from many White House duties. She was married to prominent attorney George Hay.

Biography
Elizabeth “Eliza” Kortright Monroe was born to James Monroe and Elizabeth Monroe (née Kortright) in December 1786 in Virginia. She spent much of her childhood in Paris during the French Revolution, when her father was the American minister to France. She attended school at Maison d'éducation de la Légion d'honneur, the school set up by Henriette Campan, a former lady-in-waiting to Marie Antionette. While at the school, Hay "befriended many women of European royal families", including Hortense de Beauharnais, daughter of Josephine de Beauharnais and future mother of Napoleon III. In 1803, at the age of 17, Hay returned with her family to the United States. By then, she was fluent in both French and English. In 1808, at the age of 22, she married attorney and judge George Hay, who was from Virginia.

James Monroe assumed the presidency in 1817, when Hay was 31. During his administration, she often acted as unofficial First Lady when her mother was ill. Hay was "primarily remembered for her domineering style and insistence that every iota of protocol be followed." Her "influence over her father was marked." She was also rumored to be snobbish, difficult to work with, and to have "an already high opinion of herself." In the book Executive Privilege: Two Centuries of White House Scandals, writer Jack Mitchell refers to Hay as a snob and  "a bit of a society bitch."

Hay and her husband had a daughter Hortensia, whose godmother was her mother's close friend Hortense de Beauharnais. Hortense, by then Queen Consort of the Netherlands, would send Hortensia presents, including oil portraits of herself, her brother Eugene, and Henriette Campan. The friendship with Hortense did not afford Hay an invitation to a ball at Caroline Bonaparte's Château de Neuilly, as "the sister of an Emperor could not be expected to receive the daughter of an honest republican." Hortensia married Lloyd Nicholas Rogers of Baltimore as his second wife, with whom she had three daughters.

On September 21, 1830, Hay's husband George died, followed by her mother Elizabeth two days later. Her father James died less than a year later, on July 4, 1831. Following this string of deaths, Hay moved back to Paris, where she converted to Catholicism and joined a convent. While she was living in Paris, Pope Gregory XVI sent her a bracelet he had blessed. The bracelet was "French silver-gilt, with a cameo setting of the head of Christ." 

Hay died in Paris on January 27, 1840, and was buried in the Père Lachaise Cemetery.

References

1786 births
1840 deaths
18th-century American people
19th-century American people
18th-century American women
19th-century American women
American people of Dutch descent
American people of English descent
American socialites
Cornell family
James Monroe
Eliza Monroe Hay
Acting first ladies of the United States
Children of presidents of the United States